Josef Stejskal (born 26 August 1889, date of death unknown) was an Austrian wrestler. He competed in the lightweight event at the 1912 Summer Olympics.

References

External links
 

1889 births
Year of death missing
Olympic wrestlers of Austria
Wrestlers at the 1912 Summer Olympics
Austrian male sport wrestlers